701 Oriola  is a main belt asteroid. This C-type asteroid shows possible broad absorption which may be explained by either magnesium-rich amorphous pyroxene or crystalline silicate. This likely accounts for the relatively high albedo as an outer-belt asteroid.

References

External links 
 
 

Background asteroids
Oriola
Oriola
C-type asteroids (Tholen)
19100712